Omorgus guttalis is a species of hide beetle in the subfamily Omorginae and subgenus Afromorgus.

References

guttalis
Beetles described in 1954